is a railway station in the city of Ashikaga, Tochigi, Japan, operated by the private railway operator Tōbu Railway.

Lines

Station layout
The station has a single side platform serving traffic in both directions.

Adjacent stations

History
Tōbu-Izumi Station opened on 27 September 1935.

From 17 March 2012, station numbering was introduced on all Tōbu lines, with Tōbu-Izumi Station becoming "TI-14".

Passenger statistics
In fiscal 2019, the station was used by an average of 969 passengers daily (boarding passengers only).

Surrounding area
 Ashikaga Asakura Post Office

References

External links

 Tōbu-Izumi Station information (Tobu) 

Railway stations in Tochigi Prefecture
Tobu Isesaki Line
Stations of Tobu Railway
Railway stations in Japan opened in 1935
Ashikaga, Tochigi